The Way Women Love is a 1920 American silent mystery film directed by Marcel Perez and starring Rubye De Remer, Walter Miller and Tom Magrane.

Cast
 Rubye De Remer as Judith Reytnard
 Walter Miller as Ralph Barr
 Tom Magrane as Schedd 
 Henry W. Pemberton as Trent
 Edward Elkas as The Butler
 Walter Greene as A Detective

References

Bibliography
 Munden, Kenneth White. The American Film Institute Catalog of Motion Pictures Produced in the United States, Part 1. University of California Press, 1997.
Wlaschin, Ken. Silent Mystery and Detective Movies: A Comprehensive Filmography. McFarland, 2009.

External links
 

1920 films
1920 mystery films
1920s English-language films
American silent feature films
American mystery films
Films directed by Marcel Perez
Arrow Film Corporation films
1920s American films
Silent mystery films